Quote.com is an online marketplace for insurance. It was founded in 1993. It has been owned by Dan Wesley since 2013.

History
In 1997, the company was selected to provide financial market data to ClariNet Communications.

In 1999, Lycos acquired Quote.com for $78.3 million in stock. At that time, about 10,000 people subscribed to the service, which cost between $25 to $100 per month.

In 2006, Interactive Data Corporation acquired the website and related assets for $30 million.

References

Financial services companies established in 1993
Internet properties established in 1993
Web portals